Obdam is a village and former municipality in the Netherlands, in the province of North Holland and the region of West-Frisia. The municipality ceased to exist on 1 January 2007 when it merged with Wester-Koggenland to form the new municipality of Koggenland.

Population centres

The area of the former municipality of Obdam consists of the following cities, towns, villages and/or districts: Berkmeer, Hensbroek, Obdam, Wogmeer (partly).

Train services
These services currently (2014), depart for Hoorn, from platform 1, at xx.15 and xx.45 minutes past the hour. Travel time to Amsterdam is just 55 minutes.

Chronology
1503 - The van Duvenvoorde family becomes the Lordship of the town.
1610 - Birth of Jacob, Baron van Wassenaer, Lord of Obdam; Son of Jacob van Duvenvoorde van Wassenaer
1620 - Jacob van Duvenvoorde starts using the van Wassenaer family name and becomes Jacob van Duvenvoorde van Wassenaer
1665 - Jacob, Baron van Wassenaer, Lord Of Obdam dies during a sea battle with the English while being the captain of a Dutch vessel.
1979 - Founding of the new municipality, including the towns of Hensbroek and Wogmeer.
2007 - The Obdam municipal merges into municipal Koggenland

Local government
Before the merger, the last municipal council of Obdam consisted of 13 seats, which were divided as follows:
 CDA - 5 seats
 Gemeente Partij Obdam - 4 seats
 PvdA - 2 seats
 VVD - 2 seats

References

 Statistics are taken from the SDU Staatscourant

Municipalities of the Netherlands disestablished in 2007
Former municipalities of North Holland
Populated places in North Holland
Koggenland